De Engelske Rækkehuse may refer to:

 English Terrace (Toldbodgade) (De Engelske Rækkehuse), a terrace in downtown Copenhagen
 De Engelske Rækkehuse, a housing development in Charlottenlund, Copenhagen
 De Engelske Eækkehuse, a housing development in Kongens Lyngby, Copenhagen